Corey James Tochor  (born 1976 or 1977) is a Canadian politician who has served as the Member of Parliament for Saskatoon—University since the 2019 federal election.

Tochor was elected to the Legislative Assembly of Saskatchewan in the 2011 election, to represent the constituency of Saskatoon Eastview as a member of the Saskatchewan Party caucus. Tochor was re-elected in the 2016 general election, held on April 4, 2016. On May 17, 2016, he was elected the Speaker of the Legislative Assembly of Saskatchewan, defeating the previous Speaker, Dan D'Autremont. On January 5, 2018, Tochor resigned as Speaker.

On March 10, 2018 he defeated incumbent MP Brad Trost for the Conservative nomination in Saskatoon—University. Tochor resigned his provincial seat on September 11, 2019, the same day the Writs of election were issued for the 2019 Canadian federal election. He successfully held the seat for the Conservatives.

Politics

Abortion 
Tochor voted in support of Bill C-233 – An Act to amend the Criminal Code (sex-selective abortion), which would make it a criminal offence for a medical practitioner to knowingly perform an abortion solely on the grounds of the child's genetic sex. The Abortion Rights Coalition of Canada identifies his stance as anti-abortion.

Conversion therapy 
On June 22, 2021, Tochor was one of 63 MPs to vote against Bill C-6, An Act to amend the Criminal Code (conversion therapy), which was ultimately passed by majority vote, making certain aspects of conversion therapy a crime, including "causing a child to undergo conversion therapy."

Election results

Federal

Provincial 

|- bgcolor="white"
!align="left" colspan=3|Total
!align="right"|7,809
!align="right"|100.00%
!align="right"|

|- bgcolor="white"
!align="left" colspan=3|Total
!align="right"|9,071
!align="right"|100.00%
!align="right"|

References

External links 
 

Living people
Saskatchewan Party MLAs
Speakers of the Legislative Assembly of Saskatchewan
Politicians from Saskatoon
21st-century Canadian politicians
Year of birth missing (living people)